Lathronympha is a genus of moths belonging to the subfamily Olethreutinae of the family Tortricidae.

Species
Lathronympha albimacula Kuznetzov, 1962
Lathronympha balearici Diakonoff, 1972
Lathronympha christenseni Aarvik & Karsholt, 1993
Lathronympha irrita Meyrick, in Caradja & Meyrick, 1935
Lathronympha sardinica Trematerra, 1995
Lathronympha strigana (Fabricius, 1775)

See also
List of Tortricidae genera

References

External links
tortricidae.com

Tortricidae genera
Olethreutinae
Taxa named by Edward Meyrick